Robert R. Blake (January 21, 1918 – June 20, 2004) was an American management theoretician. He did pioneer work in the field of organizational dynamics.

Together with Jane S. Mouton, he developed the Managerial Grid Model (1964), which attempts to conceptualize management in terms of relations and leadership style.

Further reading
Wiley Editors. (2003). Blake, Robert and Jane Mouton. Capstone Encyclopedia of Business. Retrieved November 20, 2007, from Credo Reference’s Web site
Wiley Editors. (2003). Robert Blake and Jane Mouton, The Managerial Grid. The Ultimate Business Library. Retrieved November 20, 2007, from Credo Reference’s Web site

See also 
 Organizational behavior

References

1918 births
2004 deaths
20th-century American businesspeople